The 2005–06 United Counties League season was the 99th in the history of the United Counties League, a football competition in England.

Premier Division

The Premier Division featured 21 clubs which competed in the division last season, along with one new club:
St Ives Town, promoted from Division One

League table

Division One

Division One featured 16 clubs which competed in the division last season, along with two new clubs:
Daventry Town, relegated from the Premier Division
Wellingborough Town, joined from the Northamptonshire Senior Youth League

Also, Eye United changed name to Peterborough Northern Star.

League table

References

External links
 United Counties League

9
United Counties League seasons